Veiled Peak is located in the Teton Range, within Grand Teton National Park, U.S. state of Wyoming. Veiled Peak is west of Mount Wister and rises to the south above Snowdrift Lake.

References

Mountains of Grand Teton National Park
Mountains of Wyoming
Mountains of Teton County, Wyoming